Cosanfe (officially, Colegio Particular Mixto San Felipe Cosanfe) is a registered private secondary high school/college in San Felipe, Retalhuleu, Guatemala. It is located at 3 Calle 3-14 zona 1, San Felipe, Retalhuleu, Guatemala.

References

High schools and secondary schools in Guatemala